Allan Leighton (born 12 April 1953) is a British businessman, chairman of The Co-operative Group since February 2015, former CEO of Asda, former chief executive of Pandora, and former non-executive chairman of the Royal Mail. He is also the co-owner of Brackley Town.

Biography
Allan Leighton was born in Hereford, the son of a Co-op shop manager, and raised in Oxford. He thought about becoming a professional footballer, but broke his leg in six places aged 15.

He supports Leeds United, where he was deputy chairman, Saracens rugby team, Northamptonshire County Cricket Club and the Toronto Maple Leafs ice hockey team.

Currently based half of the time in Toronto, Ontario, he is advising retail magnate Galen Weston and his son on Canadian retail chain Loblaw Companies (for which he is being paid C$1million), and is deputy chairman of Selfridges & Co. On 21 April 2008, Loblaw Companies announced that Leighton will take on the role of president of the company.

In 2008 Leighton was the "mentor" in Five's show Breaking into Tesco.

In February 2015, The Co-operative Group appointed Leighton as its new independent non-executive chairman, he became the first independent chairman for the business. He received a £3.4 million payoff from his previous employers Pandora, where he was chief executive from July 2013 to August 2014.

Education

Leighton attended Magdalen College School, Brackley and graduated from Oxford Polytechnic.

Career

Leighton joined Lloyds Bank as a cashier in 1972. He left to join Mars UK in Slough as a salesman in 1974 and worked at the company for eighteen years, where his colleagues included Justin King, David Cheesewright and Richard Baker. He was appointed General Sales Manager for the UK Grocery Division in 1987 (the youngest director in the company worldwide), and subsequently, managing director of Mars in Ireland and Portugal.

Leighton says he owes a lot to the Mars brothers, who gave him the practical basis for much of what he did at Asda: they would fly economy, hire a car and inspect a factory without warning before management arrived, talking to workers to get a sense of what was going on.

Leaving Mars as marketing and sales director for Pedigree Petfoods, he joined Archie Norman's management team at Asda as Marketing Director in March 1992. He attended Harvard University's six-week Advanced Management Program.

In 2009, it was reported that an £18bn merger would happen between Asda and Kingfisher plc, which would see Leighton become deputy chief executive of the enlarged group. However, the merger fell through and the company was sold to the US-based Wal-Mart for £6.2 billion in the same year.

Leighton left Asda in November 2000 and has held a number of different business roles, including:
Deputy Chairman of Leeds United Football Club from 1999-2003
Non-executive chairman of Lastminute.com from 2000-2004
Non-executive at Dyson from 2000-2004. Advising friend Sir James Dyson. 
Serving as the Royal Mail's longest-serving chairman from 2002-2008
Non-executive director at BSkyB
Appointed chairman of Pace plc, in June 2011
Non-executive at housebuilder Wilson Connolly from 1995-2003
Non-executive at power company Scottish Power, from 2001-2002
Chairman of fitness chain Cannons Health Clubs, where he wrote a weekly internal newsletter entitled "thoughts from the Jacuzzi."
Chairman of Business in the Community, from 2000-2008. Succeeded by Jeremy Darroch.
Appointed chairman The Co-operative Group in 2015
Appointed chairman of Simba Sleep in August 2018
Group Chairman at PizzaExpress from November 2020
Non-executive Chairman at BrewDog from September 2021

Awards and nominations
In 2004, Leighton was awarded an honorary degree from Cranfield University.

In 2010, the University of Central Lancashire awarded him an honorary fellowship, in recognition of his achievements.

Publications
 On Leadership (2008) Ghostwritten by Teena Lyons.
 Tough Calls (2012) Ghostwritten by Teena Lyons.

Support for Charity

Leighton completed the 2008 London Marathon in 5 hours, 55 minutes and 27 seconds in aid of Breast Cancer Care.

Leighton has bid to raise £1million for Breast Cancer Care , the charity to which he pledges all his earnings from television, speeches and his book "On Leadership".

References

External links
Onleadership.co.uk – Leighton's personal website
Going-plural.com/index.html – Leighton's website on the philosophy of "going plural"

The Sunday Times – Allan Leighton keeps running

1953 births
Living people
People from Hereford
Alumni of Oxford Brookes University
English businesspeople in retailing
Walmart people
Royal Mail people
English expatriates in Canada
People educated at Magdalen College School, Brackley
Chairmen of Post Office Limited